Bhadbhada Ghat railway station is a railway station in Raisen district of Madhya Pradesh. Its code is BVB. The station consists of two platforms. Passenger trains halt here.

References

Railway stations in Raisen district
Bhopal railway division